Michel Rouleau (born September 28, 1944) is a Canadian former professional ice hockey forward.  He played 115 games in the World Hockey Association with the Quebec Nordiques, Philadelphia Blazers, San Diego Mariners, Michigan Stags and Baltimore Blades.

External links
 

1944 births
Baltimore Blades players
Canadian ice hockey forwards
Charlotte Checkers (EHL) players
Charlotte Checkers (SHL) players
French Quebecers
Ice hockey people from Gatineau
Living people
Michigan Stags players
Philadelphia Blazers players
Quebec Nordiques (WHA) players
Roanoke Valley Rebels (SHL) players
San Diego Mariners players